Eupolemus may be:

Eupolemus (general), a Greek general
Eupolemus, a Jewish Historian
Some species of shield bugs (that is, insects from the family Acanthosomatidae) are in a genus called Eupolemus, such as the insect native to Australia known as Eupolemus virescens
Eupolemos of Argos was the name of a Greece architect who rebuilt the Heraion of Argos, a temple dedicated to Hera, after the original burned in 423 BCE
Eupolemus of Elis, an athlete in Greece; there is a statue of Eupolemus of Elis that was created by Daedalus of Sicyon